Daniel Quinn is an Australian former professional rugby league footballer. He played for the Northern Eagles in 2000 and the Newcastle Knights in 2002.

Background
Quinn was born in Maitland, New South Wales.

Playing career
Quinn made his first grade debut for the now defunct Northern Eagles in Round 12 2000 against Brisbane at Brookvale Oval.

In 2002, Quinn joined Newcastle and made 1 appearance for the club which was against the Wests Tigers in Round 15 at Campbelltown Stadium.

References

External links
Rugby League Project

Australian rugby league players
Northern Eagles players
Newcastle Knights players
Living people
1978 births
Rugby league players from Maitland, New South Wales
Rugby league second-rows
Rugby league props